Vinessa Elizabeth Shaw (born July 19, 1976) is an American film actress and model. She began her career as a child actor, and had her breakout role in Disney's 1993 Halloween comedy-fantasy film Hocus Pocus. Shaw also appeared in Ladybugs (1992) and L.A. Without a Map (1998).

While attending Barnard College, Shaw was cast in a supporting role in Stanley Kubrick's Eyes Wide Shut (1999), after which she decided to continue acting into her adulthood. Subsequent roles include in the comedy 40 Days and 40 Nights (2002), and the 2006 remake of Wes Craven's horror film The Hills Have Eyes. She was a supporting cast member in the Showtime drama Ray Donovan, and starred as Dr. Jane Mathis in the 2017 horror thriller Clinical.

Early life
Vinessa Elizabeth Shaw was born on July 19, 1976, in Los Angeles, California, the daughter of Larry Shaw and actress Susan Damante. Shaw's father, a native of Los Angeles, is a psychologist and former adjunct professor of psychology at Antioch University. Her family's original surname was "Schwartz", and her ancestry includes Jewish (from her paternal grandfather), Italian (from her maternal grandfather), German, Irish, English, Mexican, and Swedish. Her name, Vinessa, spelled with an "i" rather than the common "a", was a variation of her grandfather's name, Vincent.

Shaw made her first formal performance in a UCLA acting camp short at age 10, and subsequently toured with children's folk singer Peter Alsop at age 11. She also signed on with the Elite Models agency in 1989 at the age of 13 before beginning her acting career, and did a few modeling jobs and commercial work throughout her earlier career.

Career
Shaw had made her film debut in a little-known-of 1981 slasher film called Home Sweet Home, which dealt with a serial killer targeting a family at Thanksgiving time. She then landed parts in a handful of television roles.  She played a considerably larger role in Disney's 1993 Halloween family film Hocus Pocus alongside Bette Midler, Sarah Jessica Parker, Kathy Najimy, Omri Katz, and a young Thora Birch. Shaw completed roles in various independent films for the remainder of the 1990s.

In 1998, she enrolled at Barnard College in New York City, but dropped out to continue pursuing acting. Shaw was attending the college when she was approached by Stanley Kubrick for her role in Eyes Wide Shut, playing a prostitute who is encountered by Tom Cruise's character. In a 2008 interview, Shaw stated that Kubrick was "very influential" to her and that he "was the first person who encouraged her to continue acting". At the time of being cast, she was in college and considering alternate career options. Following her role in Eyes Wide Shut, Shaw played parts in a handful of films including the independent 2000 mystery-drama The Weight of Water with Sarah Polley and Sean Penn; the slapstick comedy Corky Romano alongside Chris Kattan; the romantic comedy 40 Days and 40 Nights, playing the feisty ex-girlfriend of Josh Hartnett's character; and a very small role in Woody Allen's Melinda and Melinda.

More low budget and independent films consumed Shaw's time until 2006, where she returned to the big screen in Alexandre Aja's remake of Wes Craven's exploitation-horror film The Hills Have Eyes, playing a young mother on a camping trip with her family who is attacked by bloodthirsty mutants in the New Mexico desert. Director Aja had wanted to cast her in the film after seeing her performance in Eyes Wide Shut. Asked why she wanted to act in a horror film, Shaw responded "Well, I guess I could be good in it since I'm so frightened of those kinds of concepts. But this one in particular really attracted me because of the filmmakers. I really thought that they had a great stance on it. Like it's very different, very heartfelt, and heartbreaking because of the characters involved. So that's kind of what made the difference. It was more of an actor's piece, if you can believe that, in a horror movie." Shaw was featured on the official one sheet promotion poster for the film, which was a box-office success.

Shaw was in the 2007 remake of the classic Western film 3:10 to Yuma with Russell Crowe and Christian Bale, the indie drama film Garden Party, as well having a leading role in Two Lovers alongside Joaquin Phoenix and Gwyneth Paltrow. That film premiered at the Cannes Film Festival in 2008 and was released theatrically in February 2009.

In 2013, she had a supporting role opposite Jude Law's character, playing his wife in Side Effects.

Personal life
Shaw was raised a Buddhist. She embraced Nichiren Buddhist philosophy as a member of the Soka Gakkai International during her first year attending college in 1996: "I was lonely and depressed, and I had so many questions about life. I called my dad every night crying, saying that I wanted to go home." As a core practice of Nichiren Buddhism, Shaw chants daimoku daily, and is also a facilitator of the SGI-USA lay Buddhist Association for Peace, Culture, and Education.

In August 2017, Shaw announced that she is expecting her first child with her husband, Kristopher Gifford (whom she first dated in 2007, got engaged to in 2008 and married in 2017). Shaw gave birth to their son, Jack.

Filmography

Film

Television

Accolades
Screen Actors Guild Awards
2008: Nominated, "Outstanding Performance by a Cast in a Motion Picture" – 3:10 to Yuma

Young Artist Award
1993: Nominated, "Outstanding Young Ensemble Cast in a Motion Picture" – Ladybugs
1993: Nominated, "Best Young Actress Recurring in a Television Series" – Great Scott!
1993: Nominated, "Best Young Actress Co-starring in a Motion Picture" – Ladybugs
1994: Nominated, "Best Youth Actress Leading Role in a Motion Picture Comedy" – Hocus Pocus
1995: Nominated, "Best Performance by a Youth Actress in a Drama Series" – McKenna
1995: Nominated, "Best Performance By a Youth Actress as a Guest Star" – Murder, She Wrote

References

External links

1976 births
Living people
20th-century American actresses
21st-century American actresses
Actresses from Los Angeles
American actresses of Mexican descent
American Buddhists
American child actresses
American child models
American film actresses
American people of English descent
American people of German descent
American people of Irish descent
American people of Italian descent
American people of Jewish descent
American people of Swedish descent
American television actresses
Hispanic and Latino American actresses
Barnard College alumni
Members of Sōka Gakkai